Stargirl is a young adult novel written by American author Jerry Spinelli and first published in 2000.

Stargirl was well received by critics, who praised Stargirl's character and the novel's overall message of nonconformity. It was a New York Times Bestseller, a Parents Choice Gold Award Winner, an ALA Top Ten Best Books for Young Adults Award winner, and a Publishers Weekly Best Book of the Year.
A sequel Love, Stargirl was released on August 14, 2007. A feature film adaptation of the novel directed by Julia Hart, produced by Kristin Hahn, and starring Grace VanderWaal was released March 13, 2020, on Disney+.

Plot

The book begins with a brief introduction to the main character, Leo, at an early age, which is followed by his move from his home state of Pennsylvania to Arizona when he is 12. Before the move, his Uncle Pete gives Leo a porcupine necktie as a farewell present, inspiring him to collect more like it. After his birthday and collection of porcupine neckties are mentioned in a local newspaper when he's 14, Leo receives a second porcupine necktie, left anonymously.

The story picks up two years later with the arrival of Stargirl Caraway at Leo's school, Mica High. Leo learns that up until this point, she has been homeschooled, but even that doesn't seem to excuse her strange behavior; for example, she comes to school in strange outfits—kimono, buckskin, 1920s flapper clothes, and pioneer clothes. She also brings a ukulele to school every day, as well as her pet rat, Cinnamon. She is so different that at first, the student body does not know what to make of her. Hillari Kimble, a well known and somewhat popular girl at Leo's school, declares that Stargirl is a fake, and speculation and rumors abound.

One of Stargirl's quirks is singing happy birthday to students when it is their birthday, bringing her ukulele to school to do so. When Hillari orders Stargirl not to sing to her on her birthday, Stargirl sings Hillari's name but directs the song to Leo and mentions in front of everyone that she thinks he is cute. Though at first rejected by most of the students, Stargirl gains a measure of popularity and is asked to join the cheerleading squad after she succeeds in getting the crowd excited about the school's losing football team while cheering for them at a game. Students mimic her behavior, and at lunch, she no longer sits alone. Her antics on the squad spark a boom in audience attendance at sporting events.

However, Stargirl's popularity is short-lived. Thanks in part to her efforts, the football and cheer season is the best in the school's history, and school spirit flourishes; however, students begin to resent Stargirl's habit of cheering for both teams, which before had added to her popularity. Their anger comes to a head during the filming of the student-run television show, Hot Seat, which is run by Leo and his best friend Kevin. During the show, a "jury" of students is invited to ask questions of the guest star. This show's guest is Stargirl, and the session turns into an embarrassing attack on Stargirl's personality and actions. An advising teacher cuts the show short, and it is never aired, but the damage is done. Shortly thereafter, Stargirl stops cheering for both teams at games, but cannot stop herself from comforting a hurt player from the opposing team during a playoff basketball game and is blamed for Mica High's loss in the following game. She is shunned by the entire student body, except for her friend Dori Dilson, Leo, and, to some extent, Kevin.

Leo praises Stargirl for her kindness, bravery, and nonconformity, and the two begin a tentative romance. They spend more and more time together, and Leo experiences her unusual lifestyle and starts helping her with various projects, such as leaving cards for people they don't know and dropping change on the sidewalk for others to find. For a while, he is deliriously happy with their relationship, but as reality sets in, he realizes that the entire school is shunning both of them. In response, Leo convinces Stargirl to act more "normal." She starts going by her real name (Susan), wears typical teen clothing, and becomes obsessed with being accepted and popular. These actions fail to produce results.

Stargirl decides that the best way to become popular is to win the state's public speaking competition, which she does. But when she returns to the school expecting a hero's welcome, only three people show up. Realizing that she has achieved nothing by trying to fit in and has betrayed her true self, Stargirl reverts to her former personality. Seeing that dating Stargirl is getting him shunned by his peer group,  Leo parts ways with her so he can be accepted in social company, choosing his peer group as a group over his sweetheart.

Despite the parting, Stargirl attends the school's spring dance—the Ocotillo ball—with Dori. Leo watches as Stargirl arrives at the dance on a bike covered in sunflowers. Though initially ignored by the other attendees, something about Stargirl attracts attention and temporary acceptance. She convinces the bandleader to play the "Bunny Hop," and the other students come to join her in the dance until the only people not in line are Hillari Kimble and her boyfriend, Wayne Parr. When the dance ends, Hillari confronts Stargirl, tells her that she always ruins everything, and slaps her as hard as she can. Stargirl returns Hillari's attack with a kind kiss on the cheek. No one in the town sees Stargirl again after that night, and Leo learns that she and her family have moved away to Minnesota.

Flashing forward fifteen years, a now-adult Leo notes that his former high school has become permanently changed, and wonders what has happened to Stargirl. In the end, he reveals that he has received a porcupine necktie in the mail one day before his most recent birthday—presumably from Stargirl.

The story continues with the sequel, Love, Stargirl, which is written from Stargirl’s perspective about her new life after Mica Area High School.

Adaptations

Stage
In January 2015, Stargirl was staged by First Stage company. The play was adapted and directed by John Maclay, and the cast were mainly teenagers. The play met with positive reviews from critics and audience.

Film
In February 2018, a feature film adaptation produced by Walt Disney Pictures was announced to be in development. The film is directed by Julia Hart, from a screenplay written by Kristin Hahn and stars Grace VanderWaal in the title role. Filming began on September 24, 2018 in New Mexico and wrapped November 16, 2018. The film was released exclusively on the streaming service, Disney+ on March 13, 2020.

While the plot remains relatively the same, various changes were made. Stargirl and Leo's relationship begins almost immediately in the film and they never formally break up, though it is slightly implied to be on Stargirl's part. Leo's fascination with porcupine ties comes from his deceased father rather than his uncle who is never mentioned. While Kevin and Dori are included, with the former's last name changed from Quinlant to Singh to match with the actor's ethnicity, various new characters are added as part of Leo and Stargirl's social group. Hillari's role is somewhat reduced, however she is still responsible for Stargirl's sadness. Rather than a typical bully, Hillari's dislike for Stargirl comes from how she inconsiderately tried to cheer up her brother, only to make him more miserable. Stargirl apologizes to her at the end. There is also heavy emphasis on music in the film with classic rock songs being used. For the dance at the end, instead of Stargirl leading everyone into the "Bunny Hop", she has Leo perform "Just What I Needed" by The Cars.

Legacy
In 2004 students from Kent, Ohio founded a Stargirl Society, which aimed to promote the nonconformist message of the novel. The society received much attention, and inspired young people all over the world to create their own societies. Spinelli's website contains a list of tips on how to start a Stargirl Society.

References

External links

 Author Jerry Spinelli's homepage

2000 American novels
American novels adapted into films
American novels adapted into plays
American young adult novels
Novels by Jerry Spinelli
Novels set in Arizona
Novels set in high schools and secondary schools

it:Stargirl